Deh-e Ashur may refer to:
 Deh-e Ashur-e Bala